Cylindroiulus caeruleocinctus is a species of millipede in the family Julidae.

References

Gallery

Further reading

External links

 

Julida
Animals described in 1864